Accept No Substitute! The Definitive Hits is a compilation album by British rock band Status Quo released in 2015.

Track listing

Disc 1
 Pictures Of Matchstick Men 3:08
 Ice in the Sun 2:10
 Down the Dustpipe 2:02
 In My Chair 3:14
 Mean Girl 3:58
 Gerdundula 3:49
 Don't Waste My Time 4:22
 Big Fat Mama 5:56
 Paper Plane 3:00
 Claudie 4:05
 Caroline 4:19
 Softer Ride 4:02
 Forty Five Hundred Times 9:54
 Break The Rules 3:41
 Little Lady 3:02
 Down Down 5:25
 Roll Over Lay Down (Live) 5:42

Disc 2
 Rain 4:37
 Mystery Song (single version) 4:00
 Wild Side of Life 3:18
 Rockin' All Over The World 3:37
 Dirty Water 3:51
 Hold You Back 4:31
 Again And Again 3:43
 Whatever You Want 4:02
 Living on an Island 3:48
 What You're Proposing 4:18
 Rock 'n' Roll 3:50
 Something 'Bout You Baby I Like 2:59
 Marguerita Time 3:30
 The Wanderer 3:28
 Red Sky 4:15
 Burning Bridges 4:20
 The Anniversary Waltz (Part 1) 5:30
 The Way It Goes 4:02

Disc 3
 Jam Side Down 3:27
 Blues And Rhythm 4:29
 Old Time Rock And Roll 2:57
 The Party Ain't Over Yet 3:52
 Beginning Of The End 4:29
 Two Way Traffic 3:59
 Rock And Roll And You 3:27
 In The Army Now (2010) 4:22
 Looking Out For Caroline 4:00
 Gogogo 4:17
 Bula Bula Quo 3:51
 Backwater (Live) 4:21
 Just Take Me (Live) 3:33
 Is There A Better Way (Live) 3:47
 Blue Eyed Lady (Live) 3:56
 And It's Better Now (Acoustic) 3:41
 Don't Drive My Car (Acoustic) 3:10
 Rock 'til You Drop (Acoustic) 2:48
 Pictures of Matchstick Men (Acoustic) 3:37

Charts

Certifications

References

Status Quo (band) compilation albums
2015 compilation albums